Satu Levelä (born 8 October 1967) is a retired female long-distance runner from Finland.

Achievements

References

1967 births
Living people
Finnish female long-distance runners
UTEP Miners women's track and field athletes
Place of birth missing (living people)